Emmett Dabney Wilson Sr. (January 10, 1913 – February 26, 1991) was an American Negro league outfielder in the 1930s and 1940s.

A native of Yazoo City, Mississippi, Wilson was the brother of fellow Negro leaguer Dan Wilson. Older brother Emmett made his Negro leagues debut for the Pittsburgh Crawfords in 1936, and played for Pittsburgh through 1938. He went on to play for the Cincinnati Buckeyes and Memphis Red Sox, and served in the United States Army in World War II. Wilson died in St. Louis, Missouri in 1991 at age 78.

References

External links
 and Baseball-Reference Black Baseball stats and Seamheads

1913 births
1991 deaths
Cincinnati/Cleveland Buckeyes players
Memphis Red Sox players
Pittsburgh Crawfords players
United States Army personnel of World War II
African Americans in World War II
Baseball outfielders
People from Yazoo City, Mississippi
African-American United States Army personnel